Thymic stromal lymphopoietin (TSLP) is a protein belonging to the cytokine family. It is known to play an important role in the maturation of T cell populations through activation of antigen-presenting cells.

TSLP is produced mainly by non-hematopoietic cells such as fibroblasts, epithelial cells and different types of stromal or stromal-like cells.

Gene ontology 

TSLP production has been observed in various species, including humans and mice.  In humans TSLP is encoded by the TSLP gene. Alternative splicing of this gene results in two transcript variants.

Function 

It mainly impacts myeloid cells and induces the release of T cell-attracting chemokines from monocytes  and enhances the maturation of myeloid (CD11c+) dendritic cells. TSLP has also been shown to activate the maturation of a specific subset of dendritic cells located within the epidermis, called Langerhans cells. Within the thymus TSLP activation of both myeloid and plasmacytoid (CD123+) dendritic cells results in the production of regulatory T cells.

Signaling 

TSLP signals through a heterodimeric receptor complex composed of the thymic stromal lymphopoietin receptor CRLF2 (also known as TSLP receptor, TSLP-R) and the IL-7R alpha chain. After binding STAT5 phosphorylation is induced, resulting in the expression of downstream transcription factors.

Disease 

TSLP expression is linked to many disease states including asthma, inflammatory arthritis, atopic dermatitis, eczema, eosinophilic esophagitis and other allergic states. The factors inducing the activation of TSLP release are not clearly defined.

Asthma 
Expression of TSLP is enhanced under asthma-like conditions (aka Airway HyperResponsiveness or AHR model in the mouse), conditioning APCs in order to orient the differentiation of T cells coming into the lungs towards a TH2 profile (T helper 2 pathway). The TH2 cells then release factors promoting an inflammatory reaction following the repeated contact with a specific antigen in the airways.

Inflammatory arthritis

Atopic dermatitis 

TSLP-activated Langerhans cells of the epidermis induce the production of pro-inflammatory cytokines like TNF-alpha by T cells potentially causing atopic dermatitis.  It is thought that by understanding the mechanism of TSLP production and those potential substances that block the production, one may be able to prevent or treat conditions of asthma and/or eczema.

Inhibition 
The TSLP signaling axis is an attractive therapeutic target. Amgen's Tezepelumab, a monoclonal antibody which blocks TSLP, is currently approved for the treatment of severe asthma. Fusion proteins consisting of TSLPR and IL-7Rα which can trap TSLP with excellent affinity have also been designed. Additional approaches towards TSLP/TSLPR inhibition include peptides derived from the TSLP:TSLPR interface, natural products  and computational fragment-based screening.

References

Further reading

External links 
 

Immunology